"Cancer for the Cure" is a song by American rock band Eels. It was released as a single from their 1998 album Electro-Shock Blues.

Release 

The song peaked at number 60 in the UK Singles Chart.

The song featured in the soundtrack to the 1999 film American Beauty.

Track listing

CD single

References

External links

1998 singles
Eels (band) songs
Songs written by Mark Oliver Everett
Song recordings produced by Mark Oliver Everett
Songs about diseases and disorders
1998 songs

Songs about cancer